Mistreatment (also known as Assault and Battery) is a 1969 Swedish drama film directed by Lars Lennart Forsberg. The film won the Guldbagge Award for Best Film and Forsberg won the Guldbagge Award for Best Director at the 7th Guldbagge Awards.

Cast
 Knut Pettersen as Knut Nilssen
 Björn Granath as Björn
 Berit Persson as Berit
 Bjoern Kanvert as Dir Hedqvist
 Hans Hellberg as Author

References

External links
 
 

1969 films
1969 drama films
Swedish drama films
1960s Swedish-language films
Swedish black-and-white films
Best Film Guldbagge Award winners
Films whose director won the Best Director Guldbagge Award
1960s Swedish films